Ariel Gregorio Bogado Llanos (born 24 December 1983) is a Paraguayan football forward who is currently a free agent. He came back to Nacional for the 2008 Apertura tournament of Paraguay where he was one of the top scorers with 10 goals.

Mexico

In July 2008, Bogado was loaned to Atlas of Mexico, and on 10 December 2008 it was announced that Bogado was playing now for U.A.N.L. for Clausura 2009.

His contract in Paraguay ended and he is currently unattached.

International goals

|-
| 1. || 22 February 2012 || Estadio Feliciano Cáceres, Luque, Paraguay ||  || 2-0 || 2-1 || Friendly Match
|}

References

External links
 Ariel Bogado at BDFA.com.ar 
 Soccerway Profile

1983 births
Living people
Paraguayan footballers
Paraguayan expatriate footballers
Paraguay international footballers
Paraguayan Primera División players
Liga MX players
Sportivo Trinidense footballers
Sportivo Luqueño players
Club Nacional footballers
Tigres UANL footballers
Atlas F.C. footballers
Ñublense footballers
Expatriate footballers in Chile
Expatriate footballers in Mexico
Association football forwards